Heine Ernst Jensen (born 11 February 1977) is a Danish handball coach of the Chinese national team and Sandnes HK.

He participated with the Germany at the 2011 World Women's Handball Championship in Brazil.

References

External links

1977 births
Living people
Danish male handball players
Danish handball coaches
People from Thisted
Handball coaches of international teams
Expatriate handball players
Danish expatriate sportspeople in China
Danish expatriate sportspeople in Germany
Danish expatriate sportspeople in Norway
Danish expatriate sportspeople in Slovakia
Sportspeople from the North Jutland Region